Callidium powelli is a species of beetle in the family Cerambycidae. It was described by Chemsak & Linsley in 1963.

References

Callidium
Beetles described in 1963